The Aitken is a future petascale supercomputer installed at the Ames Research Center facility, manufactured by Hewlett Packard Enterprise. It consist of 1,150 HPE SGI 8600 nodes, with an estimated performance of 3.69 petaflops.

It is based on the supercomputer prototype Electra, where more efficient cooling methods were sought, being energy saving over performance is one of its features.

Aitken is intended for lunar landing and related research, as part of the plans for sending people to the moon in 2024.

References 

NASA supercomputers
SGI supercomputers